Mutare Central is a constituency of the National Assembly of the Parliament of Zimbabwe, located in Mutare in Manicaland Province. Its current MP since the 2018 election is Innocent Gonese of the Movement for Democratic Change Alliance.

Electoral history 
In the 2008 parliamentary election the seat was won by the MDC candidate loyal to Morgan Tsvangirai.The ZANU-PF candidate came second followed by the MDC candidate loyal to Arthur Mutambara.

Other candidates polled a total of 138 votes (1.34%)

References

https://web.archive.org/web/20080401052750/http://www.sokwanele.com/thisiszimbabwe/archives/796
https://web.archive.org/web/20080303001109/http://www.newzimbabwe.com/pages/electoral159.17766.html

Mutare
Parliamentary constituencies in Zimbabwe